The Asian Winter Games (AWG) is an international multi-sport event held every four years for members of the Olympic Council of Asia (OCA) which features winter events. The Japanese Olympic Committee first suggested the idea of holding a winter version of the Asian Games in 1982. Their efforts were rewarded when they were finally given hosting rights for the first edition that was held in Sapporo in 1986, as the city had the infrastructure and expertise gained from hosting of the 1972 Winter Olympics.

From having only seven member nations of the Olympic Council of Asia taking part in the first edition, the number of nations competing in the Winter Asiad has consistently grown. In the 2007 Asian Winter Games in Changchun, 27 out of the 45 members fielded a record number of competitors, while all 45 NOCs sent delegations for the first time ever in Winter Asian history.

Although games in Lebanon in 2009 were considered, they ultimately did not take place. After the 2017 Asian Winter Games in Sapporo, the next edition is scheduled to be held in 2029.

List of Asian Winter Games 

 For the 2017 Games, the Olympic Council of Asia invited athletes from Oceania. Two countries from the region (Australia and New Zealand) participated along with 30 NOCs from Asia.

Sports

Medal count

See also
 Winter Olympic Games

References

External links
2011 Asian Winter Games official website
Olympic Council of Asia

 
Asian international sports competitions
Quadrennial sporting events
Winter multi-sport events
Multi-sport events in Asia
Olympic Council of Asia
Recurring sporting events established in 1986
Winter sports in Asia